Agapiya (from ) is an old and uncommon Russian Christian female first name. Its masculine version is Agapy. Its colloquial form is Ogapiya. The substandard colloquial form Agapeya was also used.

The diminutives of "Agapiya" are Agapa, Gapa, Ganya, Gasya, Aga, and Agasha.

References

Notes

Sources
Н. А. Петровский (N. A. Petrovsky). "Словарь русских личных имён" (Dictionary of Russian First Names). ООО Издательство "АСТ". Москва, 2005. 
[1] А. В. Суперанская (A. V. Superanskaya). "Современный словарь личных имён: Сравнение. Происхождение. Написание" (Modern Dictionary of First Names: Comparison. Origins. Spelling). Айрис-пресс. Москва, 2005. 
[2] А. В. Суперанская (A. V. Superanskaya). "Словарь русских имён" (Dictionary of Russian Names). Издательство Эксмо. Москва, 2005. 

